
 (German and Scandinavian for "riding master" or "cavalry master") is or was a military rank of a commissioned cavalry officer in the armies of Germany, Austria-Hungary, Scandinavia, and some other countries. A Rittmeister is typically in charge of a squadron (a company-sized unit called a "troop" in the United States, as opposed to the U.S. cavalry squadron of larger battalion size), and is the equivalent of a Hauptmann rank (en: captain). 
The various names of this rank in different languages (all Germanic, plus Estonian) were:
 
 
  (bokmål; the spelling ritmester was used until 1907) or rittmeister (nynorsk)
 
 

The Dutch equivalent, Ritmeester, is still the official designation for officers in the cavalry branches of the Royal Dutch Army.

The Norwegian rank, rittmester/rittmeister, still serves as the official designation for officers in the armoured and mechanized infantry branches of the Norwegian Army. In Sweden the rank was known as ryttmästare, and in Denmark (until 1951) as ritmester. The spelling ritmester was used in Norwegian until 1907.

The armies of Poland, Finland, Lithuania and Russia adopted, but localised, the Germanic term for someone of similar rank. These were: 
 ,
 ,
 ,
  (rotmistr).

In the Polish army (from the 15th century to the mid-20th century) a rotmistrz commanded a formation called a rota. However, a rotmistrz of hussars was a commander of between 100 and 180 hussars, with a lieutenant of hussars as his second-in-command. The Lithuanian term was rotmistras. In earlier times the rotmistrz served as the commander of an infantry or cavalry company, though sometimes he would temporarily be assigned field rank tasks e.g. commanding an entire regiment or even a larger formation. In the cavalry the rank continued until 1945 as a company level title. Applied to the commander of a troop, it was equivalent of a modern-day captain.

The rank was also adopted by Russian New Regiments as rotmistr (ротмистр) and later formalized in Table of Ranks as the cavalry post; until 1798, and between 1883 and 1918, a lower-ranking shtabs-rotmistr (штабс-ротмистр) also existed, representing the ranks of Senior Captain and Junior Captain in the Russian Imperial Guards Cavalry, Army Cavalry, Gendarmerie and Border Guards by 1914.

In British and Commonwealth military forces, a Riding Master is an appointment, not a rank. In the Household Cavalry Regiment a suitable Warrant Officer within the ranks of Riding Instructors is commissioned from the ranks. The duration of this appointment is determined by the Regimental Lieutenant-Colonel and, once appointed, the Riding Master is responsible to the Commanding Officer of the Household Cavalry Regiment for the training of recruits and remounts.

Insignia

Current

Former

Notable rank holders

Rittmeister Carl Bolle
Rittmeister Bruno Richter
Rotmistrz Witold Pilecki
Rotmistrz Atanazy Miączyński

See also
Comparative military ranks
Comparative military ranks of World War I

References

German words and phrases
Military ranks
Military ranks of Austria
Military ranks of Denmark
Military ranks of Finland
Military ranks of Germany
Military ranks of Norway
Military ranks of Poland
Military ranks of Russia
Military ranks of Sweden
Military ranks of the Netherlands
Cavalry units and formations